Yakuza is an American rock band formed in Chicago in 1999. They have been acclaimed for their incorporation of jazz and world music elements.

History
Yakuza was formed in 1999. The band debuted with its independently released album Amount to Nothing in 2000. The album was met with acclaim from Terrorizer and the Chicago Sun Times. Yakuza followed its release with a tour alongside Candiria and Burnt by the Sun, eventually leading to a slot on the Vans Warped Tour.

Such exposure led to a record contract and the release of their second album, Way of the Dead, through Century Media Records in 2002. Yakuza then shared the stage with Opeth, The Dillinger Escape Plan, Lacuna Coil and Mastodon. Jazz musician Ken Vandermark guests on the record (a unique live performance from 2002 is on YouTube). While the band received critical acclaim, the record failed to meet sales expectations; as a result, Way of the Dead was the only Century Media release. Eric Plonka parted ways in 2002 to start scientist. In 2005, the band signed with Prosthetic Records; in 2006, Samsara was released. 

Samsara was recorded by Matt Bayles (Isis, Botch, Pearl Jam) at Volume Studios in Chicago. Yakuza enlisted a wide variety of musical guests on the album, including pianist Jim Baker, cellist Fred Lonberg-Holm, Sanford Parker, and Mastodon’s Troy Sanders. 

Yakuza released Transmutations in 2007. This album incorporates more psychedelic elements alongside stretching, doomy movements and the jazz influences, while also incorporating breakneck grind riffs and grooves. The album features guest performances by world-renowned jazz percussionists Hamid Drake and Michael Zerang. This is unique for the fact that the two rarely play together, except during their annual "Winter Solstice Performances" in Chicago.

In 2010, the band released Of Seismic Consequence, their first album for Profound Lore Records.

In 2012 the band released Beyul again for Profound Lore Records.

Musical style and influences

The Prosthetic record label describes them this way:

Influence is also noted from King Crimson, John Coltrane, Tortoise, and Napalm Death. Bruce Lamont has discussed an appreciation for Pink Floyd, Huun Huur Tu, Peter Brötzmann, Battles, Enslaved, Brighter Death Now, George Orwell, Ethiopian music, and Blut Aus Nord.

Their musical style has been described as avant-garde metal, progressive metal, alternative metal, experimental rock, jazz metal, art metal and post-metal.

Discography
Amount to Nothing (2001)
Way of the Dead (2002), Century Media Records
Samsara (2006), Prosthetic Records
Transmutations (2007), Prosthetic Records
Of Seismic Consequence (2010), Profound Lore Records
Beyul (2012), Profound Lore Records

Band members

Current members
 Bruce Lamont – saxophone, clarinet, vocals, effects
 James Staffel – drums, percussion, keyboard
 Matt McClelland – guitar, vocals
 Jerome Marshall – bass guitar, vocals

Former members
 Eric Plonka – guitar, vocals, mixing
 Eric Clark – bass guitar, vocals
 John E. Bomher – bass guitar
 Ivan Cruz– bass guitar, vocals

References

External links

 Yakuza's page on Prosthetic Records
 Yakuza's MySpace Page

Heavy metal musical groups from Illinois
American progressive metal musical groups
American avant-garde metal musical groups
Abacus Recordings artists
Musical groups established in 1999
Musical quartets
1999 establishments in Illinois
Profound Lore Records artists